Listed here are all  known games released for the PC-98.

List of games

References

External links
 – PC98 Games index

PC-98
PC-98